The men's 30 kilometre skiathlon cross-country skiing competition at the 2018 Winter Olympics was held on 11 February 2018 at 15:15 KST at the Alpensia Cross-Country Skiing Centre in Pyeongchang, South Korea. The event, split into half distance classic skiing and half distance skate skiing, was won by Simen Hegstad Krüger, for whom this was the first Olympic medal. There was a podium sweep for Norway with Martin Johnsrud Sundby and Hans Christer Holund winning silver and bronze medals, respectively.

Summary
The field included all the 2014 medalists: the defending champion Dario Cologna, the silver medalist Marcus Hellner, who was also the 2010 champion, and the bronze medalist Martin Johnsrud Sundby. Only Sundby returned to the podium.

At 20 km, a group of 15 skiers, which included all eventual medalists, was leading the race, about 20 seconds ahead of the rest of the field. About 5 km before the finish line, Krüger escaped and was not caught by the rest, winning the gold medal. From the chasing group, Sundby and Holund escaped less than 2 km before the finish. Eventually, Sundby was leading, and Holund did not catch him, winning bronze.

Qualification

A total of up to 310 cross-country skiers qualified across all eleven events. Athletes qualified for this event by having met the A qualification standard, which meant having 100 or less FIS Points in the distance classification. The Points list takes into average the best results of athletes per discipline during the qualification period (1 July 2016 to 21 January 2018). Countries received additional quotas by having athletes ranked in the top 30 of the FIS Olympics Points list (two per gender maximum, overall across all events). Countries also received an additional quota (one per gender maximum) if an athlete was ranked in the top 300 of the FIS Olympics Points list. After the distribution of B standard quotas, the remaining quotas were distributed using the Olympic FIS Points list, with each athlete only counting once for qualification purposes. A country could only enter a maximum of four athletes for the event.

Competition schedule
All times are (UTC+9).

Results
The race was started at 15:15.

References

Men's cross-country skiing at the 2018 Winter Olympics
Men's pursuit cross-country skiing at the Winter Olympics